The Silent Lady is a 1917 American silent drama film directed by Elsie Jane Wilson and starring Gretchen Lederer, Zoe Rae and Winter Hall.

Cast
 Gretchen Lederer as Miss Summerville
 Zoe Rae as Little Kate
 Winter Hall as Philemon
 Harry Holden as Peter
 J. Edwin Brown as Capt. Bartholomew
 Lule Warrenton as Mrs. Hayes
 E. Alyn Warren as Dr. Carlyle

References

Bibliography
 Robert B. Connelly. The Silents: Silent Feature Films, 1910-36, Volume 40, Issue 2. December Press, 1998.

External links
 

1917 films
1917 drama films
1910s English-language films
American silent feature films
Silent American drama films
American black-and-white films
Universal Pictures films
Films directed by Elsie Jane Wilson
1910s American films